Santa's Rockin'! is the 20th album release from Australian children's music group, the Wiggles. It is also the third Wiggles Christmas video release. It was released in 2004 by ABC Music and distributed by Roadshow Entertainment.

Track list

 "Introduction"
 "Ring-A-Ding-A-Ding-Dong"
 "Introduction"
 "Great Big Man in Red" (featuring John Forgety)
 "Introduction"
 "Mary's Boy Child"
 "Introduction"
 "Captain Feathersword's Christmas Dance"
 "Introduction"
 "Rockin' Santa!" (featuring John Forgety)
 "Introduction"
 "Noche De Paz" (Silent Night)
 "Introduction"
 "This Little Baby is Born Again" (featuring Ross Wilson)
 "Introduction"
 "Wags Stop Your Barking, It's Almost at Christmas Day" (featuring Barry Williams)
 "Introduction"
 "Christmas Barcarolle" (Let the World Rejoice)
 "Introduction"
 "Dorothy's Christmas Roses"
 "Introduction"
 "Away in a Manger"
 "Introduction"
 "Henry the Champion Christmas Wrapper"
 "O Come All Ye Faithful"
 "Introduction"
 "Day of Joy, Day of Peace" (Hamish's Lullaby)
 "Outro"

Personnel
Credits adapted from the liner notes of Santa's Rockin.

 The Wiggles are: Murray Cook, Jeff Fatt, Anthony Field, Greg Page
 Produced by: Anthony Field
 Musical Arrangements: The Wiggles, Dominic Lindsay
 Vocals: Greg Page
 Backing Vocals: The Wiggles
 Guest Vocals: John Fogerty, Barry Williams, Ross Wilson, Santa Claus, Fernando Moguel, Fernandito Moguel, Julio Moguel
 Manzillas: Craig Abercrombie, Brett Clarke, Ryan De Saulnier, Sam Moran, Paul Paddick, Mark Punch
 Guitars: Anthony Field, John Field, Robin Gist, Mark Punch
 Bass: Murray Cook, Chris Lupton
 Keyboard: Jeff Fatt, Steve Blau, Dominic Lindsay
 Brass: Dominic Lindsay
 Drums: Tony Henry
 Percussion: Dominic Lindsay, Steve Machamer

Video

Santa's Rockin'! was released on video in 2004.

Song List
 "Captain Feathersword's Christmas Dance"
 "Ring-A-Ding-A-Ding-Dong"
 "Great Big Man in Red" (featuring John Forgety)
 "Away in a Manger"
 "Christmas Barcarolle" (Let the World Rejoice)
 "Henry the Champion Christmas Wrapper"
 "This Little Baby is Born Again" (featuring Ross Wilson)
 "Noche De Paz" (Silent Night)
 "Dorothy's Christmas Roses"
 "O Come, All Ye Faithful"
 "Wags Stop Your Barking, It's Almost at Christmas Day" (featuring Barry Williams)
 "Rockin' Santa!" (featuring John Fogerty)

Cast
The cast as presented on the video:

 The Wiggles are
 Murray Cook
 Jeff Fatt
 Anthony Field
 Greg Page

 Additional Cast
 Captain Feathersword: Paul Paddick
 Dorothy the Dinosaur: Lyn Stuckey
 Wags the Dog: Kristy Talbot
Henry the Octopus: Katherine Patrick

 Special Guest Musicians
 John Forgety
 Fermando Moguel Sr.
 Fermandito Moguel Jr.
 Julio Moguel
 Barry Williams
 Ross Wilson

Notes

References

External links

2004 albums
The Wiggles albums
The Wiggles videos
2004 video albums
Australian children's musical films